Dom Pedro José, Duke of Loulé (Pedro José Folque de Mendoça Rolim de Moura Barreto; born in Lisbon on 30 April 1958) is a claimant to the defunct Portuguese throne, as the head of the House of Braganza and Duke of Loulé.

Personal life 
Born in Lisbon in 1958, he married D.ª Margarida Correa de Barros Vaz Pinto in 1997, with whom he has a son and a daughter.

Claims to the throne 
The current claimant to the Portuguese throne is the Infanta Ana de Jesus Maria of Braganza's great-great-great-grandson, Pedro José Folque de Mendoça Rolim de Moura Barreto. He is styled 6th Duke of Loulé in Dom Filipe Folque de Mendoça work on the "A Casa de Loulé e suas Alianças" book,  (who also registered the style of Dom, which the Loulés had not traditionally used, although entitled to do so). 

During the exile of Miguel I of Portugal and his male heirs from 1834 until 1950, Infanta Ana's descendants remained domiciled in Portugal. Therefore, the claim of the current duke to the defunct throne, as the infanta's dynastic representative, has been contrasted with that of Duarte Pio of Braganza, great-grandson and heir of Miguel I. In "As Senhoras Infantas filhas de D. João VI", published in Lisbon in 1938, Ângelo Pereira quotes, on page 161, a letter from the infanta to her brother Dom Pedro, assuming her marriage had not been authorized (although nothing in Portugal's law required a cadet infanta to obtain royal permission to marry). The Dukes of Loulé have not, in the past, pressed any claim to the throne publicly, whereas the Portuguese government and media have accorded some indications of recognition to the claimant Duarte Pio as the dynasty's royal representative since the death of Maria Pia of Saxe-Coburg and Gotha Braganza in 1995. Since the Miguelist line has been disinherited by King and law of 1834, the Dukes of Loulé as being the highest legitimate senior members of the Braganza family have claimed the throne of Portugal.

Honours

Foreign orders 
 Order of Saints Maurice and Lazarus
 Sacred Military Constantinian Order of St. George

Dynastic orders

Sovereign and Grand Master
 Real Ordem dos Cavaleiros de Nosso Senhor Jesus Cristo
 Real Orden de San Benito de Avís, Ordem de São Bento de Avis
 Real Orden Militar de Santiago de la Espada
 Real Orden de Nuestra Señora de la Concepción de Villaviciosa
 Ordem Real de Santa Isabel
 Real y Militar Orden de San Miguel del Ala
 Real Orden Dinástica San Nuno de Santa Maria

References 

Living people
1958 births
House of Braganza
Pretenders to the Portuguese throne
Portuguese infantes